The Saudi Tourism Authority (STA) is an organ of Saudi Arabia's Ministry of Tourism that is concerned with promoting travel and tourism industry of the country. Established in March 2020 by King Salman against the backdrop of the surging COVID-19 pandemic, it is the official promoter of the Visit Saudi program and supervises tourism-related marketing campaigns domestically and internationally.

History 
The Saudi Tourism Authority was established on March 10, 2020 through a royal decree issued by King Salman after approval from the Council of Ministers and upon recommendations from the Council of Economic and Development Affairs. In June 2020, it launched the Tanaffasa programme, which lasted between 25 June and 30 September that saw 10 natural tourist spots being selected across the country for tourists and travelers to explore Saudi Arabia's summer season. In December 2020, the body organized the Sheeta Haulaka programme, which lasted between 10 December and the end of March 2021 that saw 17 destinations being selected within Saudi Arabia, allowing tourists and travelers to explore the country's geographical and climatic diversity during the winter season. In March 2021, it launched the Tourism Makers initiative which aimed at encouraging small and medium business enterprises in the private sector to engage in the country's growing tourism industry. In December 2021, it launched the Ruh as-Saudiyah programme that organized events to showcase the culture and heritage of Saudi Arabia and aimed at targeting tourists from the member states of the Gulf Cooperation Council as well as the Middle East region.

References 

Tourism ministries
Government ministries of Saudi Arabia